In enzymology, a choline dehydrogenase is an enzyme that catalyzes the chemical reaction

choline + acceptor  betaine aldehyde + reduced acceptor

Thus, the two substrates of this enzyme are choline and acceptor, whereas its two products are betaine aldehyde and reduced acceptor.

This enzyme belongs to the family of oxidoreductases, specifically those acting on the CH-OH group of donor with other acceptors. The systematic name of this enzyme class is choline:acceptor 1-oxidoreductase. Other names in common use include choline oxidase, choline-cytochrome c reductase, choline:(acceptor) oxidoreductase, and choline:(acceptor) 1-oxidoreductase. This enzyme participates in glycine, serine and threonine metabolism. It employs one cofactor, PQQ.

References

 
 
 
 

EC 1.1.99
Pyrroloquinoline quinone enzymes
Enzymes of unknown structure